The 2007 Masters of Sprint was held on 6 January 2007 in Rotterdam Ahoy Sportpaleis in Rotterdam. The event was held for the first time and scheduled in between the 2007 Six Days of Rotterdam. Nine of the world's best track sprint cyclists challenged each other to crown the Master of Sprint at the end of the day.

Results

200 metre time trial
The riders started with a 200-metre time trial to place them into three series of three riders who were facing each other.

Series
In the series three riders faced each other in a sprint competition, with the winner qualifying automatically for the semi finals, while the others were forced to ride the repechages first.

Repechages
The losing riders of the series entered the repechages in three series of two riders, with the winners eventually qualifying for the semi finals.

Semi finals
The semi finals existed of two series with three riders. The winners both qualified for the final, while those crossing the line in second position would be fighting for the bronze medal. The third finishers met each other in the fifth place decider.

Finals
In the finals Theo Bos outsprinted Craig McLean to become Master of Sprint. Arnaud Tournant claimed the bronze medal in his confrontation with Roberto Chiappa.

References

Masters of Sprint
Masters of Sprint
International cycle races hosted by the Netherlands